Hypselodoris maritima is a species of colourful sea slug or dorid nudibranch, a marine gastropod mollusk in the family Chromodorididae.

Distribution
This nudibranch is found in the Western Pacific Ocean from New Caledonia to Japan.

Description
Hypselodoris maritima has a white body with a yellow and blue mantle edge and foot. There are black striated lines present on the upper dorsum. The gills and rhinophores are white, lined with orange. This species can reach a total length of at least 20 mm. It is similar in appearance to Hypselodoris nigrolineata

References

Chromodorididae
Gastropods described in 1949